Bourne Town Football Club is a football club based in Bourne, Lincolnshire, England.

History
The club was established in 1883 and joined the Peterborough & District League in 1911. Although they left the league in 1929, they returned the following season and were Division One champions in 1933–34. They left the league again in 1935, but returned in 1937 and went on to win the league for a second time in 1939–40. After World War II the club were champions in 1945–46 and 1946–47, after which they joined the United Counties League. However, they struggled in the new league, finishing second-from-bottom in 1948–49 and 1949–50, bottom in 1953–54 and second-from-bottom again in 1954–55 and 1955–56. After leaving the league in 1956, they rejoined the Peterborough & District League, before switching to Division One South of the Central Alliance in 1958.

Bourne won Division One South in 1959–60, and in 1961 they joined the newly-reformed Midland League. After finishing second-from-bottom in 1964–65, they returned to the United Counties League, and were placed in Division One. They finished as runners-up in their first season back in the league, and went on to win back-to-back league titles in 1968–69 and 1969–70, also winning the Knock-Out Cup in the latter season. A third title was won in 1971–72, after which Division One was renamed the Premier Division. The club won the league for a fourth time in 1990–91, a season which also saw them win the league's Benevolent Cup. They remained in the Premier Division until the 2009–10 season, when they were relegated to Division One.

Ground
The club plays its home fixtures at Abbey Lawn on Abbey Road.

Honours
United Counties League
Premier Division champions 1965–66, 1968–69, 1969–70, 1971–72, 1990–91
Knock-Out Cup winners 1969–70
Benevolent Cup winners 1990–91
Central Alliance
Division One South champions 1959–60
Peterborough & District League
Champions 1933–34, 1939–40, 1945–46, 1946–47
Lincolnshire Senior A Cup
Winners 1971–72, 2005–06
Lincolnshire Senior B Cup
Winners 1960–61
Lincolnshire Intermediate Cup
Winners 1985–86

Records
Best FA Cup performance: Third qualifying round, 1961–62, 1962–63, 1965–66
Best FA Trophy performance: First round, 1972–73
Best FA Vase performance: Fourth round, 1989–90
Record attendance: 3,000 vs Chelmsford City, FA Trophy, 1970
Most goals: David Scotney
Most league goals in a season: Dick Smith, 54 goals, 1971–72
Most appearances: Colin Needham

See also
Bourne Town F.C. players
Bourne Town F.C. managers

References

External links

 
Football clubs in England
Football clubs in Lincolnshire
Association football clubs established in 1883
1883 establishments in England
Peterborough and District Football League
United Counties League
Central Alliance
Midland Football League (1889)